Carabus italicus italicus is a black coloured subspecies of beetle from family Carabidae, found in Italy and Switzerland.

References

italicus italicus
Beetles described in 1826